One athlete from Costa Rica competed at the 2006 Winter Olympics in Turin, Italy.

Cross-country skiing

Arturo Kinch, participating in his 5th Olympics at 49 years old, finished 95th in his only race, ahead of one other racer.

Distance

References

External links
 
 Costa Rican Olympic Committee

Nations at the 2006 Winter Olympics
2006 Winter Olympics
Winter Olympics